Mud Lake is the current or former name of over 300 lakes within the U.S. state of Michigan.

*Note on lakes that span more than one county: The county column only shows the first county returned by GNIS in this column.

See also
List of lakes in Michigan

References 

Mud Lake
Mud